Bête noire ("black beast" in French, meaning something that is an object of aversion or the bane of one’s existence) may refer to:

 Bête Noire (album), an album by British singer Bryan Ferry, released on Virgin Records in November 1987
 Bête Noire (comics), a comic anthology
 Bête Noire, an NCIS (season 1) episode